The 1994 Thuringian state election was held on 16 October 1994 to elect the members of the 2nd Landtag of Thuringia. The incumbent coalition government of the Christian Democratic Union (CDU) and Free Democratic Party (FDP) led by Minister-President Bernhard Vogel was defeated. The CDU suffered only minor losses, but the FDP lost its representation the Landtag. After the election, the CDU formed a grand coalition with the Social Democratic Party (SPD), and Vogel continued in office.

Parties
The table below lists parties represented in the 1st Landtag of Thuringia.

Election result

|-
! colspan="2" | Party
! Votes
! %
! +/-
! Seats 
! +/-
! Seats %
|-
| bgcolor=| 
| align=left | Christian Democratic Union (CDU)
| align=right| 605,608
| align=right| 42.6
| align=right| 2.8
| align=right| 42
| align=right| 2
| align=right| 47.7
|-
| bgcolor=| 
| align=left | Social Democratic Party (SPD)
| align=right| 420,236
| align=right| 29.6
| align=right| 6.8
| align=right| 29
| align=right| 8
| align=right| 33.0
|-
| bgcolor=| 
| align=left | Party of Democratic Socialism (PDS)
| align=right| 235,556
| align=right| 16.6
| align=right| 6.9
| align=right| 17
| align=right| 8
| align=right| 19.3
|-
! colspan=8|
|-
| bgcolor=| 
| align=left | Alliance 90/The Greens (Grüne)
| align=right| 64,041
| align=right| 4.5
| align=right| 2.0
| align=right| 0
| align=right| 6
| align=right| 0
|-
| bgcolor=| 
| align=left | Free Democratic Party (FDP)
| align=right| 45,651
| align=right| 3.2
| align=right| 6.1
| align=right| 0
| align=right| 9
| align=right| 0
|-
| bgcolor=| 
| align=left | The Republicans (REP)
| align=right| 18,298
| align=right| 1.3
| align=right| 0.5
| align=right| 0
| align=right| ±0
| align=right| 0
|-
| bgcolor=| 
| align=left | New Forum (FORUM)
| align=right| 15,060
| align=right| 1.1
| align=right| 1.1
| align=right| 0
| align=right| ±0
| align=right| 0
|-
| bgcolor=|
| align=left | Others
| align=right| 17,298
| align=right| 1.2
| align=right| 
| align=right| 0
| align=right| ±0
| align=right| 0
|-
! align=right colspan=2| Total
! align=right| 1,421,748
! align=right| 100.0
! align=right| 
! align=right| 88
! align=right| 1
! align=right| 
|-
! align=right colspan=2| Voter turnout
! align=right| 
! align=right| 74.8
! align=right| 3.1
! align=right| 
! align=right| 
! align=right| 
|}

Sources
 Landtagswahl 1994 in Thüringen - endgültiges Ergebnis

1994
1994 elections in Germany